Dehestan (also Romanized as "dehestān") is a type of administrative division of Iran. It is above the village and under the bakhsh. , there were 2,400 dehestans in Iran.

References

Subdivisions of Iran
Types of administrative division